Nanchang Yaohu Airport is an airport in Nanchang, Jiangxi, China, mainly used by Hongdu Aviation Industry Group Ltd., a major Chinese aircraft manufacturer, for test flights. It also serves as a general aviation airport.

Facilities
It may be used for test flights of the Comac C919 aircraft.

History
Since its founding in 1951, Hongdu Aviation had used Nanchang Qingyunpu Airport for test flights. With the expansion of the city of Nanchang, Qingyunpu Airport became surrounded by the increasingly urban Qingyunpu District and restricted its development. On 23 December 2009, the Jiangxi provincial government reached an agreement with Aviation Industry Corporation of China, the parent company of Hongdu Aviation, to build Yaohu Airport in the Nanchang Aviation Industrial City as the replacement for Qingyunpu Airport. Construction officially began on 24 November 2016, and the airport was opened on 16 August 2018. The total cost was 1.65 billion yuan.

References 

Airports in Jiangxi
Transport in Nanchang
Airports established in 2018
2018 establishments in China
Hongdu